Herbert Edward Jepson (Herb or Herbie) Familton (31 March 1928 – 19 May 2002) was an alpine skier from New Zealand.  
He competed for New Zealand at the 1952 Winter Olympics at Oslo. He came 77th in the Giant Slalom, despite a severely broken thumb. He had gone as a travelling reserve, and replaced the team captain Roy McKenzie, who withdrew because of injury. The family said that it was a lifetime source of satisfaction to him that he beat all the Australians.

He was a foundation member of the North Otago Ski Club, and help develop Awakino. He also took part in tennis, yachting, game shooting and gliding. He played the violin then viola, and was a stalwart of the Oamaru operatic and concert orchestras.

He was educated at Oamaru South School, Waitaki Boys' High School and Lincoln College where he got a diploma. He was an insurance and real estate agent, sharebroker and auctioneer in the family firm of J. D. Familton and Sons of Oamaru.

He was born in Oamaru and died in Dunedin Hospital, leaving his wife Valerie, two daughters and a son.

References

Sources 
 Skier first Kiwi in Winter Olympics: Obituary in The Otago Daily Times (Dunedin) of 13 July 2002, p. A35
 North Otago skiing personality: Obituary in The Press (Christchurch) of  13 July 2002, p. D9

External links 
 

1928 births
2002 deaths
New Zealand male alpine skiers
Olympic alpine skiers of New Zealand
Alpine skiers at the 1952 Winter Olympics
Sportspeople from Oamaru
People educated at Waitaki Boys' High School
Lincoln University (New Zealand) alumni